is a Japanese contemporary artist known for his provocative works of manga, painting, video, photography, sculpture, and installation. Though less well known internationally than Takashi Murakami or Yoshitomo Nara, he is recognized in Japan as one of the preeminent figures of Japanese contemporary art.

Biography 
Makoto Aida was born on October 4, 1965 in Niigata Prefecture in rural Japan. Since 2001, he has been married to artist Hiroko Okada. Together they have son Torajiro Aida (born 2001), who is a blockchain software engineer. The family formed an art performance group called "Aidake", in which they mocked the traditional family roles of children in a 2015 performance "Recital" at the Museum of Contemporary Art Tokyo.

Four of the members of the modern art collective Chim-Pom had previously worked with Aida.

A retrospective exhibition, "Aida Makoto: Monument For Nothing" was held in 2012 to 2013 at the Mori Art Museum in Tokyo.

See also
Censorship in Japan

References

External links 
 Mizuma Art Gallery artist web page
 Video: Interview with Makoto Aida - Bye Bye Kitty!!! (February 2011), Japan Society
 Makoto Aida retrospective at the Mori Art Museum

1965 births
Living people
People from Niigata (city)
Tokyo University of the Arts alumni
Japanese contemporary artists